Robert Donald Hunt (born 7 July 1995) is an English professional footballer who plays as a right back for Leyton Orient. He has played in the English Football League for Brighton & Hove Albion and Oldham Athletic.

Career

Brighton & Hove Albion
Born in Dagenham, Greater London, Hunt joined Brighton & Hove Albion when he was twelve. After progressing through the club's youth system and the development squad, Hunt signed his first professional contract in May 2013. Two years later, he signed another contract for another season.

Hunt made his first-team debut for Brighton on 9 August 2016 in a 4–0 home victory over Colchester United in the EFL Cup, playing the full 90 minutes. Hunt made his league debut for Brighton on 17 September against Burton Albion, coming on for Bruno in the 73rd minute. After making his debut, Hunt was quoted as saying: "It was a great experience and I'm just delighted to have made my league debut after coming here when I was 15 or 16. It was a great experience and I thoroughly enjoyed it."

Following his good performance in the EFL Cup and the development squad in the first half of the 2017–18 season, Hunt signed a contract with the club, keeping him until 2018. Upon leaving the club, Hunt reflected on his time at Brighton & Hove Albion, quoting: "I can't thank them [Simon and Vic] enough and it feels like I've known them for longer than five or six years. Seeing them every day, learning off them and seeing how good their coaching is, has made me into a better player."

Oldham Athletic
After being told by the club that he was to be loaned out, Hunt joined League One club Oldham Athletic on 26 January 2017 on a loan deal lasting until the end of the 2016–17 season. He made his debut four days later, coming on as an 84th-minute substitute in a 2–1 home loss against Bradford City. In a follow up match, he played the whole 90 minutes as Oldham won 1–0 away to Chesterfield. He started eight more matches before suffering hamstring injuries. Although he later recovered from a hamstring injury for the second time, Hunt, however, remained out of the first team for the rest of the season. After making ten appearances, Hunt returned to his parent club at the end of the season.

Hunt signed for Oldham Athletic permanently on 13 July 2017 on a three-year contract. Hunt's first appearance after signing for the club on a permanent basis came in the opening match of the 2017–18 season, in a 2–0 home loss against Oxford United. Although he found himself competing with Gevaro Nepomuceno, Hunt started in every match before suffering a hamstring injury. After recovering from a hamstring injury, Hunt returned to the first team on 26 September 2017, starting in the right-back position in a 3–2 home win over Peterborough United.

Swindon Town
Hunt signed for League Two club Swindon Town on 24 June 2019 on a two-year contract after his contract with Oldham was terminated by mutual consent.

Career statistics

Honours
Swindon Town
EFL League Two: 2019–20

References

External links
Profile at the Swindon Town F.C. website

1995 births
Living people
Footballers from Dagenham
English footballers
Association football defenders
Brighton & Hove Albion F.C. players
Oldham Athletic A.F.C. players
Swindon Town F.C. players
English Football League players